The Trentino-Alto Adige/Südtirol provincial elections of 2003 took place on 28 October 2003.

Lorenzo Dellai (Civica) was elected President of Trentino, while the South Tyrolean People's Party retained by a landslide the leadership of South Tyrol.

It was the first election since the constitutional reform of 2001. Thus the former regional election was replaced by the combination of two separate provincial elections and the Region did not provide vote totals region-wide.

Trentino

South Tyrol

Elections in Trentino-Alto Adige/Südtirol
2003 elections in Italy